Nelsonia is a genus of rodent in the family Cricetidae, found in Mexico. 
It contains the following species:
 Goldman's diminutive woodrat (Nelsonia goldmani)
 Diminutive woodrat (Nelsonia neotomodon)

References
Musser, G. G. and M. D. Carleton. 2005. Superfamily Muroidea. pp. 894–1531 in Mammal Species of the World a Taxonomic and Geographic Reference. D. E. Wilson and D. M. Reeder eds. Johns Hopkins University Press, Baltimore.

 
Rodent genera
Taxa named by Clinton Hart Merriam
Taxonomy articles created by Polbot